Vice Admiral Filippo Maria Foffi is an Italian Navy officer, who served as Head of Fleet Command of the Italian Navy.

He joined the Navy and attended the Italian Naval Academy from 1972 to 1976.

In January 2012 he was appointed Chief of Personnel before being promoted to vice admiral on 1 July 2012 and appointed Deputy Chief of Naval Staff.

He served as Commander in Chief of the Italian Fleet from January 25th, 2013 till 14 September 2016.

References

Italian admirals
1953 births
Military personnel from Rome
Living people